James Macfarlane Robison (22 December 1927 - 29 March 2015) was an Australian rules footballer who played with Hawthorn in the Victorian Football League (VFL).

Notes

External links 

Jim Robison's playing statistics from The VFA Project

1927 births
Australian rules footballers from Melbourne
Hawthorn Football Club players
Box Hill Football Club players
Old Scotch Football Club players
2015 deaths
People from the City of Stonnington